Zabolotnie Tatars (Siberian Tatar: сас татарлар; Sas tatarlar) are a subgroup of the Siberian Tatars. They live in the North-West parts of the Tobolsky District, Tyumen Oblast.

Origins

Their traditional areas of settlement are separated from Tobolsk, the Russian and Siberian Tatar settlements by Irtysh River, by impassable swamps which is the reason for their name in the Russian language (literally, Tatars who live behind the swamps). This separation also helped them to preserve some elements of their traditional culture, which has been lost by other Siberian groups.

References

Siberian Tatars
Tyumen Oblast
Indigenous peoples of North Asia